TSS Cambridge was a passenger vessel built for the Great Eastern Railway in 1886.

History

The ship was built by Earle's Shipbuilding in Hull for the Great Eastern Railway and launched on 11 October 1886. She was launched by the Mayor of Cambridge (Mr. W. B. Redfern), accompanied by the Deputy-Mayor (Mr. Alderman Deck).

She was placed on the Harwich to Hook of Holland route.

She was sold in 1912 to the Anglo-Ottoman Steamship Company. In 1919 she was acquired by  the Administration de Navire a Vapeur Ottomane, Galatea, Constantinople and renamed Gul Nehad. She was sold again in 1922 and renamed Gulnihad. She was scrapped in 1937.

References

1886 ships
Steamships of the United Kingdom
Ships built on the Humber
Ships of the Great Eastern Railway